Allium tolmiei (Tolmie's onion) is a plant species native to Idaho, eastern and central Oregon, southeastern Washington, northwestern Nevada and northeastern California. It was discovered by and named for Dr. William Fraser Tolmie.

Two varieties are currently recognized:

References

tolmiei
Flora of the Great Basin
Flora of the Northwestern United States
Flora of California
Flora of Nevada
Endemic flora of the United States
Onions
Plants described in 1950
Taxa named by John Gilbert Baker
Flora without expected TNC conservation status